The Women's Keirin is one of the 9 women's events at the 2010 UCI Track Cycling World Championships, held in  Ballerup, Denmark  on 28 March 2010.

21 Cyclists from 15 countries participated in the contest. After the 3 qualifying heats, the fastest 2 riders in each heat advance to the second round. The remaining ones face a first round repechage

The riders that did not advance to the second round race in 3 repechage heats. The first 2 riders in each heat advance to the second round along with the 6 that qualified before.

The first 3 riders from each of the 2 Second Round heats advance to the Final and the remaining will race a consolation 7-12 final.

Results

First round

First round repechage

Second round

Final 7-12 places

Final

References

First Round Results
First Round Repechage Results
Second Round Results
Finals Results

Women's keirin
UCI Track Cycling World Championships – Women's keirin